Ernst Reiss (24 February 1920, Davos – 3 August 2010, Basel) was a Swiss mountaineer, who together with Fritz Luchsinger was the first to climb the fourth highest mountain on earth in 1956.

On 18 May 1956, Reiss and Luchsinger successfully climbed the  Lhotse, the fourth highest mountain on earth. Lhotse is connected to Mount Everest via the South Col on the border of Tibet and Nepal.

Reiss was a member of the 1956 Swiss Everest–Lhotse expedition. At the end of April and start of May, the expedition erected some high camps. From the last high camp at the "Geneva Spur" on 18 May, Luchsinger and Reiss climbed the summit of Lhotse mountain. Their colleagues Ernst Schmied and Jürg Marmet were successful on 23 May and one day later Dölf Reist and Hansruedi von Gunten made the second and third climb on Mount Everest.

Reiss died in Basel, Switzerland, on 3 August 2010, aged 90.

Books 
 Mein Weg als Bergsteiger. Frauenfeld: Huber 1959

References 

Swiss mountain climbers
1920 births
2010 deaths